Manuel Domingos Vicente (born 15 May 1956) is an Angolan politician who served as the vice president of Angola between September 2012 and September 2017. Previously he was chief executive officer of Sonangol, Angola's state oil company, from 1999 to 2012, and he briefly served in the government as the minister of State for Economic Coordination in 2012.

Early life and education
Born at Sambizanga neighborhood in Luanda, his father was a shoemaker while his mother was a laundress. Vicente was raised by President José Eduardo dos Santos eldest sister, Isabel Eduardo dos Santos. He received primary and secondary education at the São Domingos Mission School. However, his studies was interrupted by financial problems and he had to work as a locksmith and linotypist to help support the family. He earned an electronic engineering degree at the University of Angola (Agostinho Neto University) in 1983. After working as a chief engineer during the 1980s, he headed the technical department of the Ministry of Oil from 1987 to 1991. He was appointed as Deputy Director-General of Sonangol, the state oil company, in 1991.

In his professional training, Vicente had his degrees Substation and Transmission Lines, Furnas / Brazil-1985 Business Management of Petroleum, London, 1991, Marketing of Petroleum and its Derivatives, London-1991 Economics of Oil Operations - Petroleum Institute, London, 1991, Risk Analysis and Decision in the Oil Industry (OGCI) - Calgary 1992 petroleum Economics - (OGCI) - London 1992, among others connected to the oil industry.

Political career
In 1999, Vicente was appointed as head of Sonangol. In that key post, he presided over the most important sector of the Angolan economy and was considered a close associate of President José Eduardo dos Santos. During his time in charge of the company, oil production increased dramatically. He routinely traveled abroad, acquiring "an excellent reputation from the international business community". Vicente was appointed as a member of the Political Bureau of the Popular Movement for the Liberation of Angola (MPLA), the ruling party, in December 2009.

A September 2011 report in Novo Jornal claimed that dos Santos intended for Vicente to be his successor. The report was followed by a flurry of speculation. Vicente was, however, reappointed for another term at the head of Sonangol in December 2011, briefly tempering the speculation.

President dos Santos appointed Vicente as Minister of State for Economic Coordination on 30 January 2012; Francisco de Lemos José Maria succeeded Vicente at Sonangol. In line with earlier speculation, the move was generally interpreted by observers as suggesting that dos Santos was positioning Vicente as his eventual successor. It appeared that Vicente's government post would give him a great deal of authority in managing the economy, and it would bolster Vicente's credibility and experience given that he had previously only been involved in the oil industry. Nevertheless, it was believed that some other leading figures in the ruling party were skeptical about Vicente, given his relative inexperience in politics, and could be trying to resist the President's efforts to position him for the succession.

Agence France-Presse reported in February 2012, citing an MPLA source, that Vicente would have the second spot on the MPLA's candidate list for the 2012 election, behind dos Santos, and would become Vice President of Angola after the election. As anticipated, the MPLA Central Committee designated President dos Santos as head of the MPLA party list and Vicente as the second candidate on the list on 13 June 2012. The MPLA won the election, and Vicente took office as Vice President on 26 September 2012.

In August 2014 Manuel Vicente participated, representing the Angolan Head of State, in the United States–Africa Leaders Summit, an initiative of the American president, Barack Obama, held in Washington DC under the theme "Investing in the future of Africa."

Manuel Vicente was present at the 69th General Assembly of the United Nations, which took place in September 2014 in New York City. The Angolan Vice-President defended a reform in the UN Security Council, which, according to him, should “be more in line with the international context and reflect an equal geographical representation through the increase in the number of permanent members”, namely by including an African country. In his speech, the Angolan Vice-President also approached issues such as the resurgence of armed conflicts and the religious fundamentalism in some African countries, as well as the importance of disarmament and the combating of drug and human trafficking and transnational organized crime.

In November 2014, Manuel Vicente was distinguished with the "Sirius Award" by the multinational corporation Deloitte.

In December 2016, the MPLA chose João Lourenço, the Minister of Defense and Vice-President of the MPLA, as the party's top candidate and therefore its presidential candidate for the 2017 election. Lourenço, and not Vicente, was thus expected to succeed dos Santos as President.

References

Angolan businesspeople
Agostinho Neto University alumni
Businesspeople in the oil industry
1956 births
Living people
Vice presidents of Angola
Angolan politicians
People from Luanda
Petroleum in Angola
21st-century Angolan people